Alfonso Quijada Urías (born 8 December 1940), is a Salvadoran poet and an author. Urías has published various poems such as the anthology "De aquí en adelante" (San Salvador), in conjunction with the poets José Roberto Cea, Manlio Argueta, Tirso Canales and Roberto Armijo. Many of his works deal with the effects of war and the realities of urban life in Central America.

Biography 
Urías was born in Quezaltepeque, in the La Libertad Department of El Salvador.

In 1962, he won the second prize in the III Certamen Cultural de la Asociación de Estudiantes de Humanidades de la Universidad de El Salvador. In 1963, he won the third prize from the Juegos Florales de Zacatecoluca. In 1967, he won the first prize for poetry at the Juegos Florales de Quetzaltenango in Guatemala. In 1971 he won first prize at the Bienal de Poesía Latinoamericana in Panama.

In 1981, he moved to Nicaragua, and later to Mexico, where he worked as a journalist. In 2003, he was awarded the "Premio de Poesía Instituto Cervantes". He now lives in Canada.

Selected works

Poetry
 Poemas (San Salvador, 1967)
 Sagradas escrituras (1969) 
 El otro infierno (1970) 
 Los estados sobrenaturales y otros poemas (San Salvador, 1971),
 La esfera imaginaria (Vancouver, 1997), 
 Es cara musa (San Salvador, 1997)
 Toda razón dispersa (San Salvador, 1998).

Prose
 
 Cuentos (San Salvador, 1971), 
 La fama infame del famoso a(pá)trida (San Salvador, 1979),
 Para mirarte mejor (Tegucigalpa, 1987), 
 Lujuria tropical (novela, San Salvador, 1996).

References

External links 
 Biography 
 Selwction of poems at palabravirtual.com
Poems

1940 births
Living people
People from Quezaltepeque
Salvadoran poets
Salvadoran male writers
Male poets
Salvadoran emigrants to Canada